Gwenneth Jean Harden  (born 1940) is an Australian botanist and author.

In 1990 the first of her four volumes of the Flora of New South Wales was published. The four-volume set was fully revised in 2000.

The nightcap oak (Eidothea hardeniana) is named in her honour.

References 

20th-century Australian botanists
Botanists with author abbreviations
1940 births
Botanists active in Australia
Living people
Recipients of the Medal of the Order of Australia